Longshan National Forest Park, also known as Hunan Baili Longshan Longshan National Forest Park, is a national park in Yangshi Town, Lianyuan, Hunan, China. Located in southern Lianyuan, it is bordered by Hetang Town on the southeast, Maotang Town on the southwest, Fengping Town on the north, and Louxing District of Loudi on the east.

History
In 1992 it was designated as a provincial forest park by the Hunan Provincial Forestry Department. In 2006, it was classified as a national forest park by the State Forestry Administration. In 2010, the Longshan area of Xinshao County was merged into the park and its name was changed to "Hunan Baili Longshan Longshan National Forest Park".

Geography

In began to construct in 1975 and completed in 1979.

Fauna and flora
Longshan National Forest Park contains an outstanding variety of endemic flora and fauna, of exceptional value to biology. The vegetation in the park is a subtropical evergreen broad-leaved forest with abundant animal and plant resources. There are 164 species of mammals inhabit the park, of them, there are 12 species under class II national protection, such as golden pheasant, Chinese sparrowhawk, and hoplobatrachus tigerinus. It has a forest coverage rate of almost 100%. There are more than 1,672 plant species cultivated in the park of which 54 species have national key protected plants.

Historical site
On the top of the mountains, there is a Taoist temple named "Palace of the King of Medicine". It was built in 1774 during the Qianlong period (1736–1795) of the Qing dynasty (1644–1911).

Tourist attractions
A 5D glass bridge was officially opened to the public on July 10, 2018. Construction started in February 2018 and work was finished in July 2018.

See also
 List of protected areas of China

References

External links
 

National parks of China
Protected areas established in 1992
Parks in Hunan
1992 establishments in China
Tourist attractions in Lianyuan